Pöchlarn is a town in the district of Melk in the Austrian state of Lower Austria. The painter and writer Oskar Kokoschka was born here in 1886.

Population

Personalities

 Rüdiger von Bechelaren
 Oskar Kokoschka, painter
 Johann Rasch
 Ursula Strauss, actress

References

Establishments in the Margraviate of Austria
Cities and towns in Melk District
Populated places on the Danube